Die Rechnung – eiskalt serviert (English title: Tip Not Included) is a 1966 German thriller film directed by Helmut Ashley and starring George Nader, Yvonne Monlaur, and Heinz Weiss. It was the fourth film in the Jerry Cotton series.

Plot
An elaborate bank robbery takes place and the gangsters succeed although the FBI had been warned. The bank president dies of a heart attack. Jerry Cotton, who is considered accountable for this major failure, loses his badge over this. Being the man he is, Cotton doesn't let the evil-doers forget that he has unfinished business with them. He catches even the last one although he must jump onto a flying helicopter in order to get him.

Cast

Bibliography

References

External links

1966 films
1960s crime thriller films
German crime thriller films
German sequel films
West German films
1960s German-language films
Films directed by Helmut Ashley
Films set in the United States
German black-and-white films
Films based on crime novels
Films based on German novels
1960s German films